Welgevonden is a village in Dr Kenneth Kaunda District Municipality, North West Province, South Africa.

References
tumelo_matlhaku011

Populated places in the JB Marks Local Municipality